Laljhadi is a Gaupalika in Kanchanpur District in the Sudurpashchim Province of far-western Nepal. Laljhadi has a population of 22569.The land area is 154.65 km2.
It was formed by merging Shankarpur, Baise Bichwa (ward 1-4) and Dekhtabhul (ward 1-3, 5-7,9) VDCs.

References

Kanchanpur District
Rural municipalities in Kanchanpur District
Rural municipalities of Nepal established in 2017